The Nottoway River is a river in the U.S. State of Virginia and northeastern North Carolina that is  in length. The river begins in Prince Edward County and merges with the Blackwater River to form the Chowan River in North Carolina. The river is part of the Chowan River system, which empties into the Albemarle Sound in North Carolina.

Course 

The Nottoway River rises in a dense forest outside of Scholfield, an unincorporated community in Prince Edward County. The Nottoway serves as the boundary of Prince Edward and Lunenburg counties, then Nottoway and Lunenburg counties. The river serves as the boundaries for many counties such as Brunswick, Dinwiddie, Sussex, where it makes a northeastern jump, and Greensville County. The river then courses southeast into Southampton County. The river only briefly enters North Carolina for a mere  where the river ends at the confluence of the Blackwater & Nottoway Rivers, creating the Chowan River in Hertford County, North Carolina.

Fishing 
The Nottoway River is known for its abundance of bass, catfish, and bluegill, along with the river's multiple boat ramps across multiple counties.

Cities and towns
Cities and towns along the river include: 
 Courtland, Virginia
 Stony Creek, Virginia

See also
List of rivers of the Americas
List of Virginia rivers
Cactus Hill

External links

Albemarle-Chowan Watershed Roundtable
Nottoway River Watershed

References

Rivers of North Carolina
Rivers of Virginia
Rivers of Southampton County, Virginia
Tributaries of Albemarle Sound